is a Japanese voice actress affiliated with 81 Produce.

Filmography

Television animation
Burst Angel (Yuri Hongō)
Fighting Beauty Wulong series (Takada)
Fantastic Children (Chitto)
Hamtaro (Cappy-ham)
Tactical Roar (Shīna Lacerus)
Transformers: Cybertron (Coby's mother)
Papuwa (Takeuchi, Marker (young))

Dubbing roles

Live-action
Godless (Alice Fletcher (Michelle Dockery))
The O.C. (Anna Stern (Samaire Armstrong))
Oz the Great and Powerful (Strongman's Wife (Toni Wynne))

Animation
Braceface (Nina Harper)
Hi Hi Puffy AmiYumi (Ami)
Inside Out (Mother's Disgust)
The Fairly OddParents (Timmy Turner)
The Jimmy Timmy Power Hour (Timmy Turner)
The Jimmy Timmy Power Hour 2: When Nerds Collide (Timmy Turner)
The Jimmy Timmy Power Hour 3: The Jerkinators (Timmy Turner)
Pucca (Ching)
Totally Spies! (Mandy)

References

External links
 

1976 births
Living people
Voice actresses from Tokyo Metropolis
Japanese voice actresses
81 Produce voice actors